Stilla Natt is a Swedish album by Sissel Kyrkjebø, released in 1987. This album contains Norwegian and Swedish Christmas carols. It's the Swedish version of the Norwegian Christmas release Glade Jul from the same year.

Track listing

«Stilla natt»
«O helga natt»
«Nu tändas tusen juleljus»
«Det hev ei rose sprunge»
«Det lyser i stille grender»
«Deilig er jorden»
«Julepotpurri» - «Et barn er født i Betlehem»/«Her kommer dine arme små»/«Det kimer nå til julefest»/«Jeg synger julekvad»
«Mary's Boy Child»
«Jag er så glad hver julekveld»
«Den stora stjerna»

Christmas albums by Norwegian artists
Sissel Kyrkjebø albums
1987 Christmas albums